Oscar Nord (born November 6, 1996) is a Swedish professional ice hockey player. He is currently playing with AIK of the HockeyAllsvenskan (Allsv).

Nord made his Swedish Hockey League debut playing with Luleå HF during the 2014–15 SHL season.

References

External links

1996 births
Living people
AIK IF players
Luleå HF players
Malmö Redhawks players
Swedish ice hockey forwards
Ice hockey people from Stockholm